This is a non-exhaustive list of football clubs in Peru with the current 19 first division teams, and 14 second division teams. The Copa Perú has variable number of teams from the rest of the country. In 2022, more than 33,000 teams entered the competition in its different stages.

Liga 1

Liga 2

Copa Perú

Liga Departamental de Amazonas

Liga Departamental de Ancash

Liga Departamental de Apurímac

Liga Departamental de Arequipa

Liga Departamental de Ayacucho

Liga Departamental de Cajamarca

Liga Departamental del Callao

Liga Departamental del Cusco

Liga Departamental de Huancavelica

Liga Departamental de Huánuco

Liga Departamental de Ica

Liga Departamental de Junín

Liga Departamental de La Libertad

Liga Departamental de Lambayeque

Liga Departamental de Lima

Liga Departamental de Loreto

Liga Departamental de Madre de Dios

Liga Departamental de Moquegua

Liga Departamental de Pasco

Liga Departamental de Piura

Liga Departamental de Puno

Liga Departamental de San Martín

Liga Departamental de Tacna

Liga Departamental de Tumbes

Liga Departamental de Ucayali

Copa Perú (2022)

Lambayeque

Lima Metropolitana

Puno

Liga Distrital de Puno (2020)

Defunct / Inactive

See also 
 CONMEBOL

Notes

References 

 

Peru
 
Football clubs
Football clubs